Paul Alexander is a British comedy writer. He has written or contributed to My Hero, Red Dwarf, The 10 Percenters, My Spy Family, Babes in the Wood, Lovejoy, Horrid Henry, Bedsitcom, Goodnight Sweetheart,  The Green Green Grass,  My Parents Are Aliens, 2point4 children", Neighbors from Hell, Summer in Transylvania and Emmerdale.

His screenplays include Staggered  and Seeing Double.

For radio he cowrote four  series of Kim Fuller's medieval sitcom The Castle, 2007–2012.

He wrote the book for the new stage musical The Smallest Show on Earth''.

References

External links

pabloxander.com official website

 

British male screenwriters
Living people
Year of birth missing (living people)